Sir George Anthony Mann (born 21 May 1951), is a retired judge of the High Court of England and Wales.

He was educated at The Perse School and St Peter's College, Oxford.

He was called to the bar at Lincoln's Inn in 1974 and became a bencher there in 2002. He was made a QC in 1992, recorder from 2002 to 2004, and judge of the High Court of Justice (Chancery Division) since 2004.

References

1951 births
Living people
Knights Bachelor
People educated at The Perse School
Alumni of St Peter's College, Oxford
Members of Lincoln's Inn
Chancery Division judges